Institute of Architects, Pakistan is the Professional Development body of architects in Pakistan.The Pakistan council of Architects and Planners(PCATP)IS THE GOVERNING BODY under 1983 Act,passed by the Parliament.

History
It was formed in 1957 by a small group of architects.

Incorporation
It was incorporated on 22 May 1969 in Karachi under the Companies Act VII of 1913. It was formed as a limited company.

Members

Presidents
 2010-11: Shahab Ghani Khan
 2011–Present: Jehangir Khan Sherpao

Organisation
The Institute is governed by a National Council headed by a president. It also has four chapters, Islamabad, Karachi, Lahore and Peshawar each of which is headed by a chairman.

References

External links
Official Website
IAP Lahore Chapter

Architecture in Pakistan
Commonwealth Association of Architects
Professional associations based in Pakistan